The 1947–48 Montenegrin Republic League was the third season of Montenegrin Republic League. The season began in October 1947 and ended in May 1948.

Season

Qualifiers 
Except five teams which played in previous season (Sutjeska, Bokelj, Lovćen, Arsenal and Jakić), Football Association of Montenegro planned sixt place in Montenegrin Republic League 1947-48. So, sixth participant was the winner of republic qualifiers in which played 10 different teams - Jadran (Herceg Novi), Mogren (Budva), Tempo (Bar), Strugar (Ulcinj), Tršo (Bijelo Polje), IKA (Berane), Dečić (Tuzi), Kom (Andrijevica), Iskra (Danilovgrad) and Durmitor (Šavnik).
In the final game of qualifiers, Jadran Herceg Novi defeated Tempo Bar (2-1) and gained promotion to Republic League.

Championship 
In third edition of Montenegrin Republic League played six different teams. For the first time, among participants was Jadran from Herceg Novi.
After many irregularities, some games were not played and the champions' title won Bokelj. They won the champions' battle against Lovćen.
As a last placed team, Jadran was relegated to lowest-tier competitions.

Table

Qualifiers for Yugoslav Second League 
Bokelj played in qualifiers for Yugoslav Second League. In first leg, team from Kotor played against Podrinje.

Higher leagues 
On season 1947–48, one Montenegrin team played in higher leagues of SFR Yugoslavia. That was Budućnost, which participated in 1947–48 Yugoslav Second League.

See also 
 Montenegrin Republic League
 Montenegrin Republic Cup (1947–2006)
 Montenegrin clubs in Yugoslav football competitions (1946–2006)
 Montenegrin Football Championship (1922–1940)

References 

Montenegrin Republic League